Hardcore dance can refer to:
Hardcore dancing, a dance performed to hardcore punk music, related to moshing
Hardcore techno, a genre of electronic dance music